Eastlake High School is a four-year public high school in Sammamish, Washington, a suburb east of Seattle. Opened in 1993, it is one of four traditional high schools in the Lake Washington School District, serving its eastern portion.

Eastlake shares its campus with the Renaissance School of Art and Reasoning, located in portables. 

Eastlake is one of three high schools on the Sammamish Plateau, all close in proximity along 228th Avenue. Between the two public high schools is Eastside Catholic, a private secondary school that relocated to Sammamish in 2008.

In the fall of 2012, Lake Washington School District converted its four senior high schools (grades 10–12) to four-year schools (grades 9–12), moving the freshman class for the first time from the Jr. High to the district's High School. In preparation for the expansion of Eastlake's student body, a new wing (E wing) and the gym was built during the summer of 2012. This shift of grades between schools subsequently also resulted in the moving of most 6th Grade classes from the Elementary schools to the now Middle Schools.

Academics
Eastlake offers honors and Advanced Placement (AP) academic programs to prepare students for upper-division and college-level courses. Foreign languages offered at Eastlake High School include Spanish, French, Japanese, and American Sign Language.

Eastlake participates in the Running Start program. Eastlake students in the 11th or 12th grade can enroll in college-level courses at Bellevue College, CWU Sammamish, Cascadia College, or Lake Washington Institute of Technology and earn high school and college credit concurrently. The Lake Washington School District pays the college tuition for a specified number of credits taken; students are usually responsible for fees, books, and transportation.

63% of 2005 graduates attended 4-year colleges and 23% attended 2-year colleges.

97.7% of seniors in the class of 2017 graduated.

Extracurricular

Athletics
EHS is well known for its decent football program. They share tradition in sports with Skyline High School and play for one of the most popular rivalry games in the state, the "Battle on the Plateau."
They also pride themselves on having a devoted and large fan-base that is considered one of the best in the state. Eastlake High School competes in athletics in WIAA Class 4A in the KingCo 4A conference, and has won many regional and state championships.

Completed in January 2006, the school has a multi-purpose sports facility. It features two lighted synthetic surface fields operated by the city of Sammamish in cooperation with the school district. The 400-ft by 350-ft field accommodates baseball, softball, Frisbee, lacrosse, and soccer activities for adults and students year-round.

Non-athletics
Students at Eastlake have earned a number of awards for activities not related to athletics. Eastlake students received Presidential Scholar awards in 2003, 2008, and 2010.

Eastlake High School has a number of clubs and student organizations. These include a number of honor societies such as Computer Science Honor Society, Physics Honor Society, National Honor Society, Math Honor Society, French Honor Society, Spanish Honor Society and Science National Honor Society, as well as career and technical organizations (CTSOs) like TSA, DECA and HOSA, whose chapters send a number of competitors to internationals every year. During the 2018-19 school year, 29 students competed at DECA's ICDC, while 25 students competed at HOSA's ILC. In 2020, Eastlake High School students were elected to represent Washington state at TSA and HOSA.

Eastlake was the only school in the district to have a FIRST Robotics Competition robotics team (in 2016 a team at Lake Washington High School was founded). The team, officially known as Top Gun (1294), started in 2004. It has won many runner up awards at various regional events. They qualified for the first time to go to the World Championship in 2014. Again, they qualified and competed to the quarterfinals of the Newton division in 2017.

Eastlake's Drama Club has notably augmented under Director Kate Wold, being nominated and honorably mentioned for multiple 5th Avenue Awards. The Drama program has been mentioned in high honors for Outstanding Chorus two times in the span of three years. In 2018, the orchestra was nominated for Outstanding Performance by an Orchestra by the 5th Avenue Theatre for Mary Poppins, having been led by Music Director Chelsee Moe.

Notable alumni

 Curtis Borchardt, professional basketball player
 Nick Downing, retired professional soccer player
 Blake Hawksworth, professional baseball player
 Chad Orvella, former MLB player (Tampa Bay Rays)
 Ryan Lewis (American football) , professional football player
 Chase Griffin, Pepperdine University Basketball
 Surf Mesa, singer
 Marin Morrison, an American para-swimmer who competed at the 2008 Summer Paralympics in Beijing
 Rian Lindell, former NFL kicker, is a physical education teacher and football coach in Eastlake.

References

External links
Official website

High schools in King County, Washington
Schools in Sammamish, Washington
Public high schools in Washington (state)
1993 establishments in Washington (state)
Educational institutions established in 1993